Kaliningrad Stadium (Stadion Kaliningrad), also called Arena Baltika, is a football stadium on Oktyabrsky Island, Kaliningrad, Russia, which  hosted four games of the 2018 FIFA World Cup. It hosts FC Baltika Kaliningrad of the Russian First League, replacing Baltika Stadium.

Its project is based on the concept of the Allianz Arena, which hosted matches of the 2006 World Cup in Germany. The first match was played on 11 April 2018, a football match between FC Baltika and PFC Krylia Sovetov Samara.

History
The stadium was the westernmost location of the 2018 World Cup. In April 2012, the regional government chose the French architectural bureau Wilmotte & Associes, SA stadium construction project. NPO Mostovik & Mersfor Rus OOO were project partners and the Kaliningrad Region and Russian Federation were the project managers. The project itself is worth $280 million. 

In June 2014 the Omsk Arbitration Court declared "Mostovik" bankrupt and, in March 2015, termination of the contract with the company began. On 1 April 2014 a government order published by the government declared the appointment of ZAO "Crocus International" as the sole executor of the Ministry of Sports of the Russian Federation for the works on the construction. The state contract was signed between the Government of the Kaliningrad Oblast and Crocus International "to develop the project and working documentation on the design of the stadium".

On 10 June 2015 it was reported that the stadium project was sent to the state examination. On 20 July, the layout of the stadium was presented.

At first, regional authorities considered the option with the construction of new sports facilities in the city center, on the place of the current Baltika Stadium. Finally, in December 2014 it was announced that Oktyabrsky Island will be the location of the new stadium, even though it is often under threat of flooding. and work on it requires additional financial investments.

On 10 August 2015, it became known that the stadium would be named "Stadium Kaliningrad" or in the English version, Kaliningrad Stadium.

Construction

The project was based on the concept of the Allianz Arena Munich, which hosted matches of the 2006 World Cup in Germany. The project cost was anticipated as 11 billion rubles but was exceeded by far. Soil compaction work was completed in December 2014. Preparation work for construction of the infrastructure started in January 2015. In addition, a new bridge was built over the river to provide better connections to the surrounding area. Testing for the stadium piles and foundation began in July 2014. As a multiple-purpose arena, Kaliningrad Stadium can be used for football matches and other sporting events, conferences and concerts.

Safety and security 

This is a two-tier stadium with a VIP section, equipped with ultramodern security systems and CCTV. The stadium is equipped with more than 700 security cameras, alarm and public alert systems, metal detectors, indicators of hazardous liquids and explosives.

Work on consolidation and drainage of Oktyabrsky Island

During excavation, some pre-war buildings' infrastructure was found which was not marked on the topographic survey. These issues have been dealt with. The project includes construction of the overpass East from Oktyabrsky island and from the street.

Tournament results

2018 FIFA World Cup 
Kaliningrad Stadium hosted four games for the 2018 FIFA World Cup.

2019 European Under-18 Rugby Union Championship

2020 Rugby Europe Championship

2021 Rugby Europe Championship

After the World Cup
The seating capacity of 35,000 seats was to be reduced to 25,000 before the stadium was handed over to the football club Baltika, which had 4,000 spectators to matches in 2017. In March 2019 the federal government allocated 40 million rubles to renovate the stadium.

References

External links

2018 FIFA World Cup stadiums
Football venues in Russia
Sports venues completed in 2018
Buildings and structures in Kaliningrad
2018 establishments in Russia
Sport in Kaliningrad
Rugby union stadiums in Russia